The People's Couch is an American reality television series that premiered on October 8, 2013 on Bravo. It is based on the British television series Gogglebox. It started as a three-episode limited series that featured real people watching and discussing popular television shows and news from the past week.

Bravo later picked up the series for a full 12-episode season, and expanded the series into one-hour episodes beginning June 3, 2014. Bravo renewed The People's Couch for a second season, which premiered on October 7, 2014. The third season premiered on October 6, 2015. It was later renewed for a fourth season, which premiered on January 15, 2016. A celebrity edition of the show aired in 2020 under the name Celebrity Watch Party. In the UK and Australia it was renamed Celebrity Gogglebox USA.

Format
Each episode of the series is split into separate segments, corresponding to the shows the groups watch. Not every group is featured in every segment, and each segment is often filmed on a different day of the week. The shows featured on the show range from cable to network television series and from scripted to unscripted, many of which air on Bravo, the same network as The People's Couch.

Episodes

Season 1 (2013–14)

Season 2 (2014)

Season 3 (2015)

Season 4 (2016)

References

External links
 
 
 

2010s American reality television series
2013 American television series debuts
2016 American television series endings
English-language television shows
Bravo (American TV network) original programming
2010s LGBT-related reality television series
American television series based on British television series
Television series by All3Media
Television series about television